Parkengear is a hamlet in the parish of Probus, Cornwall, England.

References

Hamlets in Cornwall